Glenida nudiceps is a species of beetle in the family Cerambycidae. It was described by Holzschuh in 2013.

References

Saperdini
Beetles described in 2013